Pante Macassar, officially Pante Macassar Administrative Post, is an administrative post (and was formerly a subdistrict) in the Oecusse municipality and Special Administrative Region (SAR) of East Timor. Its seat or administrative centre is the suco of Costa.

References

External links 

Administrative posts of East Timor
Oecusse